= Iplacea =

Ancient city founded and named by King Tehuero

Iplacea according to an ancient legend based on some mention of the ancient historians Pliny and Ptolemy, was a city founded and named by King Tehuero on the hill of Viso, near the current Alcalá on the Henares (on the other side of the river.)

== Legendary overview ==
According to legend, this king arrived at the place with a group of ex-combatant soldiers from the Trojan War and found it fertile and with enough water, exceptional qualities for its settlement. In that case these settlers would be the precedents to the Iron Age city Ikesankom Konbouto that would later give rise to the Roman Complutum. Both Ptolemy and Pliny give this name to the hill of the Viso, perhaps to mythologize its inhabitants for having maintained a fierce resistance at the arrival of the first Romans to the area of the Henares Corridor, since this resistance will occur in almost all tribes that frequent the natural pass between the Tagus, Duero and Ebro rivers, culminating in the famous Numantino siege within the campaign commanded by Marco Porcio Catón in what will come to be the conquest of Carpetanía, begun in 195 BC and ended with the conquest of the Numancia fort in 133 BC. However, more modern readings of the inscriptions found suggest that the reading of Ikesankom Kombouto is an error. Indeed, phonetically, the inscription could be more similar to Quefar Afek which could mean "villa of the chief" which would lead us to think that it was the economic center of the zone.
